The British Columbia Aboriginal Network on Disability Society (BCANDS) is an Indigenous charitable organization in British Columbia, Canada, that provides cross disability-related support and services to Indigenous (First Nation, Métis, Inuit) peoples in Canada living with a disability, and advocates for the full inclusion of Indigenous peoples living with disabilities, both socially and economically.

BCANDS was established in 1991 to begin to address the needs of Indigenous peoples living with disabilities through services and support and through work to remove the barriers faced. BCANDS holds Special Consultative Status with the United Nations Economic and Social Council (ECOSOC) and Approved Observer status with the European Association of Service Providers for Persons with Disabilities (EASPD).

The BCANDS head office is located in Victoria, British Columbia, on the traditional territories of the Songhees People.

Areas of work / initiatives 

The British Columbia Aboriginal Network on Disability Society provides one-to-one disability related services, as well as awareness and outreach activities aimed at individuals and families, federal, provincial and territorial governments, Indigenous leadership and the public, both within Canada and at the international level.

Programs/services 

 Indigenous Disability Case Management / Navigation
 Indigenous Registered Disability Savings Plan (RDSP) Navigation
 First Nation Persons with Disabilities / Monthly Nutritional Supplement Adjudication Program
 Convention on the Rights of Persons with Disabilities (CRPD)

Awareness 
Indigenous Disability Awareness Month (IDAM)

In 2015, the organization established Indigenous Disability Awareness Month (IDAM) to raise awareness of the contributions that Indigenous peoples living with disabilities bring to Canadian communities, and holds annual events during the month. In 2017, the United Nations International Committee on the Rights of Persons Living with Disabilities, in its Concluding Observations Report, recommended to Canada to officially recognize and proclaim the month. IDAM is observed annually by various provinces in Canada, in addition to Indigenous and non-Indigenous communities and organizations.

RDSP Awareness Month

Each year during October, the organization promotes the Registered Disability Saving Plan through virtual awareness activities, community events and distribution of materials.

National Indigenous AccessAbility Week

Each year during National AccessAbility Week in Canada, the organization promotes accessibility from an Indigenous disability lens, through the hosting of awareness events and distribution of materials.

Indigenous Partnership Award

In 2015, the organization established the BCANDS Indigenous Partnership Award to recognize individuals or organizations that has made significant contributions to advancing Indigenous disability issues in Canada. Notable recipients include federal politician and Paralympian Carla Qualtrough. Recipients of the award are determined by the organizations leadership periodically, and are typically presented during Indigenous Disability Awareness Month.

National Indigenous Disability and Wellness Gathering

The organization periodically hosts a national gathering with Indigenous and non-Indigenous leadership. communities, persons living with disabilities, government and stakeholders to raise awareness of Indigenous disability in Canada.

Awards 

Finalist - Premier's Innovation & Excellence Awards - 2020

Finalist - Premier's Innovation & Excellence Awards - 2019

Essl Foundation - Zero Project International Award - 2019

Finalist - Premier's Innovation & Excellence Awards - 2018

Doctors of BC - Excellence in Health Promotion Award - 2018

Canadian Alliance on Mental Illness and Mental Health - Champion of Mental Health Award - 2018

Canadian Medical Association - Excellence in Health Promotion - 2016

March of Dimes Canada - Judge George Ferguson Award - 2015

Social Planning and Research Council of BC (SPARC BC) - Deryck Thompson Award - 2014

BC Medical Association - Excellence in Health Promotion - 2013

Canadian Mental Health Association - BC Region - Dr. Nancy Hall Public Policy Leadership Award - 2013

Notable persons 

 Ian Hinksman - Disability Advocate - co-founder of BCANDS
 Stephen Lytton - Disability Advocate - Board Member
 Richard Peter - Former Board Member - Paralympian
 Rick Hansen - Honorary Patron
 Diana Fowler LeBlanc - Honorary Patron

References 

Indigenous organizations in British Columbia
Disability organizations based in Canada
Charities based in Canada